Kangeh may refer to:
 Kangeh, Kerman
 Kangeh, Zanjan